Maxine Johnson (born 1961) is a female retired English racing cyclist.

Cycling career
Johnson represented England in the road race and 3,000 metres individual pursuit, at the 1990 Commonwealth Games in Auckland, New Zealand. Four years later at the 1994 Commonwealth Games in Victoria, British Columbia, Canada she won a bronze medal in the team time trial and competed in the road race and track points race.

In 1998 she won the season long trophy British best all rounder

Palmarès 

1990
3rd British National Road Race Championships

1993
2nd British National Road Race Championships
20:38 10 Mile Time Trial Ladies Competition Record
  
1994
1st  British National Road Race Championships
3rd Team time trial, Commonwealth Games
  2nd National Pursuit 
1st National 25
1st National Track 1k Track Champion
1995 Competition record holder for 15 miles 32:15  1996                                                                                                                                                                                                                    
1st  Points race world masters, 30-34 category

1997
Beryl Burton trophy winner
National Circuit Time Trial Champion
 
1998
1st National 25
British Best All Rounder

1999
2nd British National Circuit Race Championships

References

External links 

Commonwealth Games athlete profile

Living people
Cyclists at the 1990 Commonwealth Games
Cyclists at the 1994 Commonwealth Games
Commonwealth Games bronze medallists for England
British cycling road race champions
English female cyclists
Place of birth missing (living people)
Commonwealth Games medallists in cycling
1961 births
Medallists at the 1994 Commonwealth Games